Lester L. Erb (born April 22, 1969) is an American football coach and former player. He formerly was the running back coach and wide receivers coach at Rutgers University.

Coaching career

Baltimore Ravens
Lester Erb was an offensive quality control coach for the Baltimore Ravens for two seasons.

Iowa Hawkeyes
After a year coaching tight ends at Army, Erb joined the former Ravens offensive coordinator Kirk Ferentz to Iowa and coached running backs and wide receivers there. Erb was named one of the top recruiters in the nation while coaching at Iowa.

Nevada
Erb spent a four years coaching special teams and running backs at Nevada.

Rutgers
On January 6, 2017, it was announced that Erb would be leaving to take over as the running back coach for Rutgers. In 2018 it was decided that Erb would switch from coaching running backs to wide receivers. When Greg Schiano retook control of the program in 2020 it was announced that Erb would no longer be coaching for the Rutgers Scarlet Knights.

References

1969 births
Living people
People from Northumberland County, Pennsylvania
Players of American football from Pennsylvania
Army Black Knights football coaches
Baltimore Ravens coaches
Bucknell Bison football players
Hobart Statesmen football coaches
Iowa Hawkeyes football coaches
Nevada Wolf Pack football coaches
Rutgers Scarlet Knights football coaches
Syracuse Orange football coaches